The Samsung Z1 is a smartphone created by Samsung Electronics. It was the first phone to use the Tizen operating system.

It was released in India in January 2015, Bangladesh in February 2015 and Sri Lanka in May 2015.

The phone was succeeded by the Samsung Z3 in October 2015.

Specifications

Hardware
The Samsung Z1 features a 480×800 WVGA PLS TFT 4-inch display with a pixel density of 233 pixels-per-inch.

It has a 1.2 GHz dual-core ARM Cortex-A7 processor, 768 MB RAM, 4 GB of storage (with option for up to 64 GB of additional storage via microSDXC card) and a 1500 mAh battery.

The rear-facing camera is 3.15 megapixels with LED flash. The front-facing camera is 0.3 megapixels. The phone can record VGA (640×480) videos at 15fps.

Software
The Samsung Z1 comes with Samsung's own mobile operating system Tizen. The UI was specifically designed for users who were upgrading from feature phones to smartphones.

Sales
By June 2015 Samsung sold 1 million units.

References

Samsung mobile phones
Tizen-based devices
Mobile phones introduced in 2015
Discontinued smartphones